Stanisław Lubomirski (died 1577) was a Polish nobleman (szlachcic) and owner of the Sławkowice and Zabłocie estates.

He had two consorts, Laura de Effremis and Barbara Hruszowska. He had three children with Hruszowska: Sebastian Lubomirski, Katarzyna Lubomirska, Anna Lubomirska.

References

16th-century births
1577 deaths
Stanislaw Lubomirski (died 1577)